Tingeltangel may refer to:

 Tingeltangel (film), 1922 German silent film
 Tingel-Tangel (1927 film), Austrian silent film
 Tingel-Tangel (1930 film), German film